Gartly Castle was a 15th-century castle, about  north-east of Gartly, Aberdeenshire, Scotland, and  south of Huntly, east of the River Bogie.

History
The Barclays were the owners of the site from the 12th to the 16th century.  Before her defeat of the Gordons at the Battle of Corrichie in October 1562, Mary, Queen of Scots stayed here.

The castle ruins were demolished in 1975, with the last remains removed by 1982.

Structure 
There is no longer any trace of the castle, which had a keep.  
In 1780 it was reported to Thomas Pennant that the castle was “an old building,.., placed on a small mount, and surrounded with a deep ditch. It is a square tower; one end of it is fallen down, and shews a section of strong vaulted rooms; but there seemed nothing so singular in its structure, as to merit more particular attention”.

There was a ditch to the south, east and west.

Castles in Great Britain and Ireland
List of castles in Scotland

References

Castles in Aberdeenshire